Samuel Denison Martin (born February 7, 1983) is an American Grammy Award-winning musician, singer, songwriter and record producer. His song "Want to Want Me" (released by Jason Derulo) holds the record for the most adds in the American contemporary hit radio history. Following signing to Artist Publishing Group, Martin's first song he wrote for another artist became the song "Daylight" by Maroon 5, which peaked at number one on the Billboard charts. His writing on the album Fly Rasta, released by Ziggy Marley, led it to becoming a number-one reggae album as well as a receiving a Grammy Award. He rose to the public eye in 2014 for not only writing but being a featured artist on David Guetta's number-one singles "Lovers on the Sun" and "Dangerous". His work extends to projects with One Direction, Nick Jonas, Zedd, Flo Rida, Prince Royce, The Chainsmokers, Pitbull, Jon Bellion, Snoop Dogg, T.I., Julia Michaels, Armin van Buuren and G-Eazy. Sam Martin also has a side project called "Con Bro Chill" who have released singles including "We Should Hang Out".

Not to be confused with Sam James Martin, a UK-based singer, songwriter, multi-instrumentalist and scam artist.

Career

Early beginnings
Martin was born in New York City and raised in Lake Oswego, Oregon. He attended Lakeridge High School and went to Berklee College of Music for two years.

2012–14: Breakthrough
Martin's breakthrough came with the writing and release of "Daylight" by Maroon 5. In 2014 Martin was the contributing singer and co-writer on the song "Lovers on the Sun" and "Dangerous" by David Guetta 
Martin also collaborated with Ziggy Marley on the song "Lighthouse" from his album Fly Rasta. In 2015, Fly Rasta won the grammy for best Reggae Album.

Discography

Singles

As lead artist
"Rather Be Alone" (with Robin Schulz and Nick Martin)
Released September 2019

"Sabotage"
Released January 2019

"Sugar Is Sweet"
Released February 2019

"Long Live The Billionaire"
Released March 2018

Blue Tuesday (EP)

 "It Was Always You" Released December 2018
 "All My Tears" Released December 2018
 "I Still Haven't Found What I'm Looking For" Released December 2018
 "A Day In The Life" Released December 2018
 "Happy Christmas (War Is Over)" Released December 2018

"Bring Me Home"
Released June 2017

"It's Gonna Get Better"
Released October 2017

"Song For My Unborn Son" 
Released January 2015

As featured artist

Songwriting credits

References

Living people
1983 births
People from Lake Oswego, Oregon
Singer-songwriters from Oregon
Singers from New York City
Berklee College of Music alumni
21st-century American singers
Singer-songwriters from New York (state)